The 2003 Holy Cross Crusaders football team was an American football team that represented the College of the Holy Cross during the 2003 NCAA Division I-AA football season. Holy Cross tied for last in the Patriot League.

In their eighth and final year under head coach Dan Allen, the Crusaders compiled a 1–11 record. Ari Confesor, Steve Fox, Ben Koller and Nick Larsen were the team captains.

The Crusaders were outscored 478 to 322. Holy Cross' 1–6 conference record tied for worst in the Patriot League standings. The Crusaders' sole win came against fellow Patriot League cellar-dweller Georgetown.

Holy Cross played its home games at Fitton Field on the college campus in Worcester, Massachusetts.

Schedule

References

Holy Cross
Holy Cross Crusaders football seasons
Holy Cross Crusaders football